The Earth Observing System Data and Information System (EOSDIS) is a key core capability in NASA’s Earth Science Data Systems Program. Designed and maintained by Raytheon Intelligence & Space, it is a comprehensive data and information system designed to perform a wide variety of functions in support of a heterogeneous national and international user community. 

EOSDIS provides a spectrum of services; some services are intended for a diverse group of casual users while others are intended only for a select cadre of research scientists chosen by NASA's peer-reviewed competitions, and then many fall somewhere in between. The primary services provided by EOSDIS are User Support, Data Archive, Management and Distribution, Information Management, and Product Generation, all of which are managed by the Earth Science Data and Information System (ESDIS) Project.

Overview 
EOSDIS ingests, processes, archives, and distributes data from a large number of Earth-observing satellites, and provides end-to-end capabilities for managing NASA's Earth science data from various sources – satellites, aircraft, field measurements, and various other programs. For the Earth Observing System (EOS) satellite missions, EOSDIS provides capabilities for command and control, scheduling, data capture and initial (Level 0) processing. 

These capabilities, constituting the EOSDIS Mission Operations, are managed by the Earth Science Mission Operations (ESMO) Project. NASA network capabilities transport the data to the science operations facilities. EOSDIS consists of a set of processing facilities and Distributed Active Archive Centers distributed across the United States. These processing facilities and DAACs serve hundreds of thousands of users around the world, providing hundreds of millions of data files each year covering many Earth science disciplines. The EOSDIS project as of September 2012 reported it contained approximately 10 PB of data in its database with ingestion of approximately 8.5 TB daily.

The remaining capabilities of EOSDIS constitute the EOSDIS Science Operations, which are managed by the Earth Science Data and Information System (ESDIS) Project. These capabilities include: generation of higher level (Level 1-4) science data products for EOS missions; archiving and distribution of data products from EOS and other satellite missions, as well as aircraft and field measurement campaigns. The EOSDIS science operations are performed within a distributed system of many interconnected nodes (Science Investigator-led Processing Systems and distributed, discipline-specific, Earth science Distributed Active Archive Centers) with specific responsibilities for production, archiving, and distribution of Earth science data products. The Distributed Active Archive Centers serve a large and diverse user community (as indicated by EOSDIS performance metrics) by providing capabilities to search and access science data products and specialized services.

History 
From early 1980 through 1986, NASA supported pilot data system studies to assess the feasibility and development of publicly accessible electronic data systems. Part of the congressional approval of the EOS mission in 1990 included the NASA Earth Science Enterprise, which supported the development of a long-term data and information system (EOSDIS). This system would be accessible to both the science research community and the broader public, built on a distributed open architecture. With these functional requirements for space operations control and product generation for EOS, the EOSDIS would also be responsible for the data archival, management, and distribution of all NASA Earth science mission instrument data during the mission life.

Methods of Search

Distributed Active Archive Centers 
EOSDIS Distributed Active Archive Centers are custodians of EOS data, provide long-term storage and preservation of the data, and ensure that data can be easily accessed by users. Each center is distinguished from one another by their specific Earth system science discipline. In addition to the search-and-order capabilities provided by the Global Change Master Directory (GCMD) and the Common Metadata Repository (or CMR, which has replaced the former EOS Clearinghouse, or ECHO), the Distributed Active Archive Centers have individual online systems that allow them to provide unique services for users of a particular type of data. The center-specific systems emphasize data products, services, and data-handling tools unique to the DAAC.

DAAC-specific search tools

GCMD - Dataset Directory 
The Global Change Master Directory (GCMD) is a directory for Earth science data and services. The GCMD database currently has more than 30,000 Earth science data sets and service descriptions covering all aspects of Earth and environmental sciences. One can use the search box or select from the available keywords to search for data and services.
ECHO - Application Program Interfaces (APIs) for Search and Order

Global Change Master Directory

The Common Metadata Repository (CMR) 
Formerly known as the EOS ClearingHouse (ECHO), CMR is a metadata catalog of NASA's EOS data and a registry for related data services (e.g. reformatting, pattern recognition). CMR's catalog contains more than 3200 data sets held at 12 EOSDIS DAACs. Users can access the data and services by using general or community-tailored clients that access CMR using a series of Application Program Interfaces (APIs) defined using web services.

Earthdata Search 
Earthdata Search replaced Reverb as EOSDIS's web-based client for discovering and ordering cross-discipline data from all of CMR's metadata holdings in January 2018. Earthdata Search allows users, including those without specific knowledge of the data, to search science data holdings, retrieve high-level descriptions of data sets and detailed descriptions of the data inventory, view browse images, and submit orders via CMR to the appropriate data providers.
 Cross-DAAC searches through Earthdata Search – use the Common Metadata Repository (CMR)

Distributed Active Archive Centers

A Distributed Active Archive Center (DAAC) is a part of EOSDIS. DAACs process, archive, document, and distribute data from NASA's past and current Earth Observing System (EOS) satellites and field measurement programs. Each of the twelve DAACs serves one or more specific Earth science disciplines and provides its user community with data products, data information, user services, and tools unique to its particular science.

The following is a list of DAACs and data specializations:
 Alaska Satellite Facility (ASF) DAAC: Synthetic Aperture Radar (SAR) data, sea ice, polar processes, geophysics.
 Atmospheric Science Data Center (ASDC): radiation budget, clouds, aerosols, tropospheric chemistry.
 Crustal Dynamics Data Information System (CDDIS): satellite geodesy.
 Global Hydrometeorology Resource Center (GHRC) DAAC: severe weather interactions, lightning, atmospheric convection.
 Goddard Earth Sciences Data and Information Services Center (GES DISC): global precipitation, solar irradiance, atmospheric composition, atmospheric dynamics, global modeling.
 Land Processes DAAC (LP DAAC): surface reflectivity, land cover, vegetation indices.
 Level 1 Atmosphere Archive and Distribution System (LAADS) DAAC: radiance, atmosphere.
 National Snow and Ice Data Center (NSIDC DAAC): snow, ice, cryosphere, climate.
 Oak Ridge National Laboratory DAAC (ORNL DAAC): biogeochemical dynamics, terrestrial ecology, carbon and nitrogen cycle, environmental processes.
 Ocean Biology DAAC (OB.DAAC): ocean biology, ocean color, ocean biogeochemistry, sea surface temperature.
 Physical Oceanography DAAC (PO DAAC): sea surface temperature, ocean winds, circulation and currents, topography and gravity.
 Socioeconomic Data and Applications Data Center (SEDAC): human interactions, land use, environmental sustainability, geospatial data, multilateral environmental agreements.

See also
 ECHO Clearinghouse
 Global Change Master Directory
 Goddard Space Flight Center

References

External links
 NASA.gov
 NASA.gov
 NASA.gov
 NASA Distributed Active Archive Center (DAAC)
 Official website

NASA programs
Earth observation
Goddard Space Flight Center
Data centers
Spacecraft communication